Rainey Glacier is a tributary glacier on the north side of Archambault Ridge, descending from the Deep Freeze Range into Campbell Glacier, in Victoria Land. Named by the northern party of New Zealand Geological Survey Antarctic Expedition (NZGSAE), 1962–63, for Denys Rainey, cartographer, who assisted this and other New Zealand Antarctic expeditions with their mapping problems.

Glaciers of Victoria Land
Scott Coast